Wim Addicks (28 August 1896 – 8 July 1985) was a Dutch footballer. He played in three matches for the Netherlands national football team in 1923.

References

External links
 

1896 births
1985 deaths
Dutch footballers
Netherlands international footballers
Association football forwards
FC Amsterdam players
AFC Ajax players